Dysschema Lycaste is a moth of the family Erebidae first described by Johann Christoph Friedrich Klug in 1836. It is found in Mexico, Guatemala, Honduras and Costa Rica.

References

Dysschema